Penzensky District is an administrative and municipal district (raion), one of the twenty-seven in Penza Oblast, Russia. It is located in the center of the oblast. Its administrative center is the rural locality (a selo) of Kondol. Population: 51,308 (2010 Census);  The population of Kondol accounts for 6.5% of the district's total population.

Notable residents 

Vyacheslav Gladkov (born 1969), politician, born in the village of Kuchki
Ivan Mosjoukine (1889–1939), silent film actor, born in Kondol

References

Notes

Sources

Districts of Penza Oblast